Cyclea is a genus of flowering plants in the family Menispermaceae.

Accepted species 
 Cyclea atjehensis
 Cyclea barbata
 Cyclea bicristata
 Cyclea cauliflora
 Cyclea debiliflora
 Cyclea elegans
 Cyclea fissicalyx
 Cyclea gracillima
 Cyclea hypoglauca
 Cyclea insularis
 Cyclea kinabaluensis
 Cyclea laxiflora
 Cyclea longgangensis
 Cyclea meeboldii
 Cyclea merrillii
 Cyclea ochiaiana
 Cyclea peltata
 Cyclea pendulina
 Cyclea peregrina
 Cyclea polypetala
 Cyclea racemosa
 Cyclea robusta
 Cyclea sutchuenensis
 Cyclea tonkinensis
 Cyclea varians
 Cyclea wattii

Gallery

References

External links
 

 
Menispermaceae genera